Murtaza Javed Abbasi (born 15 March 1970) is a Pakistani politician who has been a member of the National Assembly of Pakistan, since August 2018. Previously, he was a member of the National Assembly from 2008 to May 2018 and served as the 18th Deputy Speaker of the National Assembly, from June 2013 to May 2018.He served as federal minister for parliamentary affairs since 19 April 2022.

Early life
He was born on 15 March 1970 to Javed Iqbal Abbasi.

Political career
Abbasi ran for the seat of the National Assembly of Pakistan as a candidate of Pakistan Muslim League (N) (PML-N) from Constituency NA-18 Abbottabad-II in 2002 Pakistani general election, but was unsuccessful. He received 32,527 votes and lost the seat to a candidate of Pakistan Muslim League (Q) (PML-Q).

Abassi was elected to the National Assembly as a candidate of PML-N from Constituency NA-18 Abbottabad-II in 2008 Pakistani general election. He received 72,586 votes and defeated a candidate of PML-Q.

He was re-elected to the National Assembly as a candidate of PML-N from Constituency NA-18 Abbottabad-II in 2013 Pakistani general election. He received 69,839 votes and defeated a candidate of Pakistan Tehreek-e-Insaf (PTI). In June 2013, Abbasi became 18th Deputy Speaker of the National Assembly of Pakistan.

He was re-elected to the National Assembly as a candidate of PML-N from Constituency NA-15 (Abbottabad-I) in 2018 Pakistani general election. He received 95,340 votes and defeated Ali Asghar Khan, a candidate of PTI.

References

Living people
1970 births
Pakistani MNAs 2008–2013
Pakistani MNAs 2013–2018
Pakistani MNAs 2018–2023
Deputy Speakers of the National Assembly of Pakistan
Pakistan Muslim League (N) MNAs
People from Abbottabad